Hopkins School is a private, college-preparatory, coeducational, day school for grades 7–12 located in New Haven, Connecticut.

In 1660, Edward Hopkins, seven-time governor of the Connecticut Colony, bequeathed a portion of his estate to found schools dedicated to "the breeding up of hopeful youths." With a portion of the bequest, Hopkins Grammar School was founded in a one-room building on the New Haven Green. The school relocated to its current campus in 1926. Hopkins has been coeducational since merging with Day Prospect Hill School in 1972.

History

Founding
John Davenport, a founder of the New Haven Colony, was an early proponent of education in the colony. Grammar schools of the time generally prepared young men for college, but the Puritan colony was too far from England for its citizens to attend the existing English schools.  Parents of the time were generally more concerned with spending their money on essentials such as food, and viewed formal education as an extravagance most could not afford. Davenport enlisted the help of a friend, Edward Hopkins, governor of the Connecticut Colony, to found a traditional grammar school that would teach Latin, Greek, and Hebrew grammar. The school's first home was a building on the New Haven Green.

Hopkins died in 1657 and bequeathed money to found a school dedicated to "the breeding up of hopeful youths for the public service of the country in future times." Colonial officials wanted Hopkins's bequest to remain in Connecticut and appointed three men, Davenport and two others, as executors of Hopkins's will. They created the Hopkins Fund, from which Hopkins Grammar School was established in 1660.

The exact date of Hopkins School's founding is a matter of definition. The historical record of the executors' report implies the trust was created on May 4, 1660, but since the Julian calendar was in use then, the date corresponds to May 14 on modern calendars. The papers which created the fund were presented and accepted on May 30, and many use this date as the official date of the school's founding. Finally, on June 4 (June 14 on modern calendars) Davenport transferred control of the bequest to the colony, on the condition that the colony accept responsibility for the support of the school.

The Fallow Years
"The Fallow Years" is a term coined by Thomas B. Davis in his history, Chronicles of Hopkins Grammar School, to describe the period from 1696 to 1853. During this time the school had difficulty finding qualified schoolmasters, and the Hopkins Fund often fell short in paying them. This forced the school to take up collections to meet its payroll. Consequently, there was great turnover in schoolmasters, some staying for no more than a year. Also contributing to the problem was the establishment of the Collegiate School in New Haven in 1701, which drew many local academics away from Hopkins, and which later became Yale University.

Public opinion of Hopkins and academia in general weakened the school. During this time parents wanted children who could read and write English and understand basic arithmetic, but Hopkins continued to focus on subjects that parents deemed irrelevant, such as Latin. Parents were also displeased with schoolmasters who paid little attention to struggling students, instead focusing only on the scholars. On January 12, 1713, the committee which managed the Hopkins Fund began releasing £12–£15 annually to run elementary English schools in East Haven and West Haven. New Haven stopped donating money to the Fund in 1719, which made hiring schoolmasters nearly impossible. Though the trustees of the Hopkins Fund constituted an independent body, the town was known to control them with financial pressures. Richard Mansfield served as schoolmaster from 1742 to 1747, and was the last headmaster until 1839 to serve for more than three years.

Although Hopkins School was still somewhat unpopular with the locals, the school moved to a new larger brick building on the Green, due to the growth of New Haven. Hopkins School was somewhat rare among American schools in that it remained open during the American Revolutionary War. Former schoolmaster John Hotchkiss was killed by the British in July 1779 during their invasion of New Haven, and former schoolmaster Noah Williston was captured. Although the school remained open, records seem to indicate that it was frequently closed between September 1780 and October 1781, "for vacation". Shortly after the Revolution, Hopkins hired Jared Mansfield for two terms (1786–1790 and 1790–1795) to the unique position "Master of the Grammar School" to try to stabilize the school for the future. Between Mansfield's two terms, Abraham Bishop held a six-month term as headmaster during which he proposed radical reform, including making Hopkins coeducational, most of which never came to fruition. After the end of Mansfield's second term, the school returned to the pattern of short tenures for schoolmasters.

Hopkins moved buildings again in 1803 to an even larger facility near the Green that took up nearly an entire block. Teachers were offered two-year contracts to teach at Hopkins, but rarely kept them. Hopkins boys grew "unruly and malicious", some roaming New Haven streets at night.  In 1838 the school moved once again, as the trustees believed that moving the school away from the town center would allow its students to focus more on their studies. Throughout August and September that year, they rushed through the necessary transactions to buy the new plot of land, currently the site of the Yale Law School. Following this move the trustees released an announcement to New Haven's three newspapers summarizing their hope that this new location would provide sufficient space for the boys to learn and be separate enough that they could do so in peace.

Hawley Olmstead became headmaster in 1839 and ended the line of short-termed schoolmasters as he held the position for ten years. Although Olmstead thought much like Hopkins' early masters, namely that the school existed to prepare boys for college, he also modernized the curriculum in several ways. Most notably, English was finally added to the curriculum, and he began keeping accurate school rolls which solidified his final legacy, increasing the size of Hopkins' student body. By the time Olmstead resigned due to poor health on July 28, 1849, school attendance had risen to 63 students.

As soon as Olmstead left, the school began to deteriorate once again, with attendance dropping to 45 students in 1850 and to 20 by 1853. The recently founded debate society disbanded, with seven young members forming the secret society known as "The Club". Though this club grew no larger and tried to remain quiet, parents grew so annoyed with this supposedly "rough-housing" club that it was forced to disband in 1851. After the debate society and "The Club" were gone, many students sought out new ways to express their literary interests, including founding the school newspaper, The Critic. Olmstead was seen by the trustees as a major failure and a cause of the school's rapid decline, and was quickly replaced by James Whiton, who had just recently graduated from Yale. He further revised the curriculum by adding more English classes, and school attendance saw a rapid increase once again. Whiton taught for ten years and under his leadership, enrollment climbed to more than 100 students, thus marking the end of "the fallow years."

Modern day
Headmaster George Lovell convinced the Board of Trustees to buy land on the western edge of New Haven for a new campus atop a hill in 1925. Graduate Henry Murphy laid out plans for the new campus in 1922, and designed the original Baldwin Hall building in 1925. The school opened at the new premises, the present campus, in 1926. Baldwin Hall was initially the only building, but the campus expanded greatly over the next century.

Hopkins had begun to refer to itself without "Grammar School" in the casual name by 1935, but "Grammar School" was not officially dropped until several years after Hopkins' merger with Day Prospect Hill School in 1972.  Day Prospect Hill School was itself the product of a merger between two local women's schools — the Day School (founded in 1907) and the Prospect Hill School (founded in 1930). The combined institution became the Day Prospect Hill School (DPH), a united women's education school. 

Trustee president Vince Calarco and headmaster Tim Rodd led Hopkins to buy a further  of land at its current location to establish playing fields in 1992.

In recent years alumnus John C. Malone, a wealthy telecommunications entrepreneur, has donated more than $25 million for new construction, the financial aid program, and forming the endowment.

On March 24, 2020, it was announced that Hopkins School and the Roman Catholic Archdiocese of Hartford agreed to settle a sexual abuse lawsuit involving a Catholic school teacher who was regularly allowed access to the Hopkins School and who was accused of sexually abusing boys while coaching at the school between at least 1990 and 1991. Both Hopkins and the Archdiocese of Hartford were accused of covering up the sex abuse and shielding the teacher from potential prosecution. The terms of the settlement were not disclosed. The accused teacher, Glenn Goncalo, committed suicide in 1991 as arrangements were being made for him to turn himself over to the police in connection to a different accusation. It was also reported that reports of sexual abuse at Hopkins dated as far back as 1970.

Starting with the 2022-2023 school year, Dr. Matt Glendenning will be the Head of School. Glendenning was previously the head of school at the Moses Brown Quaker school in Providence, Rhode Island.

Facilities

Baldwin Hall is the original building of the present campus. It has four floors, including the basement. It houses a computer lab, the language lab, and the Calarco Library. The library is a two floor,  space with group study rooms, an art gallery, and a faculty reading room.

Hopkins House houses the Admission Office, Business Office, College Counselling Office, and the Technology Department. This building was named for Edward Hopkins, Hopkins' first benefactor. It was finished in 1927 with the original intention of having it become a dormitory for boarding students. The program was abandoned in the 1930s due to insufficient enrollment.

The Kneisel Squash Center was originally built as an all-purpose gym in 1935 and named the Reigeluth Gym in honor of a trustee. It was designed by the architect Douglas Orr. It now houses six squash courts.

Lovell Hall houses the main school auditorium (Townshend Auditorium), drama and video production classrooms, two multipurpose classrooms, the Razors office, and teachers' offices. This building is named after longtime headmaster George Lovell, who led the school in the first half of the 20th century.

The Walter Camp Athletic Center is named after alumnus Walter Camp, who is credited with inventing American football and later was Yale's football coach.

Malone Science Center is at the center of campus and houses the science classrooms and labs. Donated by John C. Malone, it is named for Malone's father, Daniel Malone.

Heath Commons is a two-story building that houses the school dining hall and a student lounge. Heath Commons was designed by the S/L/A/M collaborative. It was completed in 2003 and won a Connecticut Design Award in 2005.

Thompson Hall was opened on 30 November 2009 on the former site of one of the upper playing fields. It is named for Mary Brewster Thompson, a long-time head of the Prospect Hill School. The three-story building has two floors of classrooms, as well as large studio art studios, pottery, photography, wood shop, and choral and orchestral spaces.

New fields opened in 2007 on the land purchased under Rodd's tenure which replaced those that Thompson Hall now stands on. An artificial turf field was installed in 2015 and named "Parr Field" in honor of the long-serving football coach, Tom Parr, who retired that year.

In September 2019, under Kai Bynum, Hopkins opened a new softball field and track.

Academics

Applicants to Hopkins undergo a series of standardized tests, and upon matriculation, testing is done to place students at the appropriate level of instruction in mathematics and languages. Hopkins' academics are broken into departments including English, mathematics, science, history, arts, modern language, classics, and computer science. Each of the three class levels — Lower, Middle, and Upper — has a different level of choice in classes.

Arts
The Arts Department is made up of student organizations and academic classes in studio and performance art. A number of student groups feature performing arts: a cappella groups such as the Harmonaires, Triple Trio, and Spirens; theater groups such as the Hopkins Drama Association; and a variety of choral and instrumental performance groups. The Keator Gallery in Baldwin Hall holds shows of student and teacher art, as well as local artists.

Humanities
The English Department is the only department in which Hopkins requires a student have at least one class in every semester. Upper-class students have two required semester classes: a college-prep writing course and a Shakespeare-centered course. The History Department core is the Atlantic Communities series that focuses on Europe, the Americas, and West Africa between 1450 and modern times. In addition, elective courses go into detail on subjects such as political science, regional studies, philosophy and religion. Advanced Placement courses are offered in United States History, European History, and Human Geography. The Language Department is divided into two subdepartments: the Classics, which covers Ancient Greek and Latin; and Modern Languages, which teaches four other languages (French, Spanish, Chinese, and Italian are currently offered).

Math and Science
The Mathematics Department offers study from pre-algebra to Linear Algebra, Multivariable Calculus, Differential Equations and Chaos Theory. The Science Department has three main tracks — Biology, Chemistry, and Physics — along which students can take entry-level courses and then more advanced AP and Honors courses. There are numerous one-off courses in subjects such as Introduction to Psychology, Human Reproduction, or Environmental Studies. The computer science department offers basic computing courses in HTML and Java.

Graduation requirements
Hopkins' one-room Latin grammar school history is still reflected in its graduation requirements. Every student is required to take an English course every semester, and Junior Schoolers are required to take Latin along with whichever other language they may take, if any. In addition to classical education, Hopkins requires three years of math courses and three years of a language, the completion of Atlantic Communities I, Atlantic Communities II, and either Atlantic Communities III (for a total of two and a half years of credit), AP US History, or AP European History (for a total of three years of credit), two years of science coursework, and one and a half credits in the Arts Department. However, this only makes up a fraction of a student's total graduation credit requirement, while the rest is fulfilled by elective and advanced courses in any of the various departments.

Athletics

Hopkins' athletics function under a trimester system, with students taking an athletic for each of the fall, winter, and spring seasons. Students may choose to participate in a team sport if they make the team, an intramural sport, or an independent sport where the student participates in a school-approved athletic activity such as martial arts lessons. Seniors may also take one season off and not take any athletic for that season. Sports offered at Hopkins vary depending on the season and include cross country, soccer, water polo, crew, football, field hockey, volleyball, basketball, fencing, track (both outdoor and indoor), swimming/diving, wrestling, squash, golf, lacrosse, tennis, baseball, and softball. Hopkins is a member of the New England Preparatory School Athletic Council and the Fairchester Athletic Association. Hopkins competes with many other private and boarding schools throughout New England and the northeast.

Notable alumni 

Due to the age of the school, it is unclear as to what year some of its alumni graduated. Those whose class is unknown, or assumed, are noted as such.

Notable alumni include:

Michael L. J. Apuzzo (class of 1957) – academic neurosurgeon, editor, futurist
Henry Baldwin (class of 1793) – U.S. Congressman, Associate Justice of the Supreme Court of the United States
Roger Sherman Baldwin (class of 1807) – U.S. Senator, Governor of Connecticut, defense attorney in Amistad case
Simeon Eben Baldwin (class of 1857) - Chief Justice of the Connecticut Supreme Court, Governor of Connecticut
Wilson S. Bissell (class of 1865) – United States Postmaster General
Andy Bloch (class of 1987) – professional poker player
Edward Bouchet (class of 1870) – physicist, first person of color to earn a Ph.D. from an American university
Augustus Brandegee (class of 1845) – lawyer, U.S. House of Representatives 
Chauncey Bunce Brewster (class of 1864) – Episcopal Church (United States) Bishop of Connecticut 
Benjamin Brewster (class of 1878) – Episcopal Bishop of Maine and Missionary Bishop of Western Colorado.
Nicholas Britell (class of 1999) – composer, pianist, film producer
Guido Calabresi (class of 1949) – US Court of Appeals judge, dean of the Yale Law School
Walter Camp (class of 1876) – founder of modern American football
Mei Chin (class of 1993) – novelist and food critic
Elisha Cooper (class of 1989) – author and illustrator
Henry Farnam (class of 1870) – railroad president
Thomas Frederick Davies, Sr. (class of 1849) – third bishop of the Episcopal Diocese of Michigan
Nicholas Dawidoff (class of 1981) – author
George DiCenzo (class of 1958) – actor, arts activist 
Alexander DiPersia (class of 2000) – film actor 
Henry Durand (class of 1877) – songwriter of Yale alma mater, "Bright College Years"
Timothy Dwight V (class of 1845) – president of Yale University
Henry W. Edwards (class of 1793) – U.S. Congressman, U.S. Senator, and Governor of Connecticut
Trey Ellis (class of 1980) – novelist
William Eno (class of 1877) – road safety advocate and inventor
Orris Ferry (class of 1840) – U.S. Congressman, senator
Ernest Flagg (class of 1876) – architect
John Geanakoplos (class of 1970) – economist
Josiah Willard Gibbs (class 1854) – father of thermodynamics
Chauncey Goodrich (class of 1840) – editor of the Webster's Dictionary 
Arthur Hadley (class of 1872) – president of Yale University
John Hays Hammond (class of 1873) – mining engineer, helped in founding of De Beers
George G. Haven, Jr. (unknown class) – businessman
Carolyn Hax (class of 1984) – advice columnist for The Washington Post
James Hillhouse (class of 1769) – U.S. Congressman, Senator
William Hoppin (class of 1824) – Governor of Rhode Island
Edward M. House (class of 1877) – diplomat, political adviser to Woodrow Wilson
John Huggins (did not graduate) – Black Power activist, leader of the Black Panther Party
William Henry Hunt (class of 1874) – federal and state judge, territorial governor of Puerto Rico
William Morris Hunt (class of 1834) – painter
Jared Ingersoll (class of 1762) – delegate to the Continental Congress; signer of the United States Constitution for Pennsylvania; Federalist vice presidential candidate
Charles Ives (class of 1894) – classical composer and insurance executive
Harold Hongju Koh (class of 1971) – dean of the Yale Law School, Assistant Secretary of State for Democracy, Human Rights
Justin Kutcher (class of 1998) – sports commentator
Scott Lowell (class of 1983) actor, best known for Queer as Folk 
Paul MacCready (class of 1943) – aeronautical engineer
John Malone (class of 1959) – telecommunications mogul 
Joseph Mansfield (class of 1817) – American Civil War major general
Robert Tuttle Morris (class of 1877) – surgeon and writer
Newton Morton (class of 1947) – founder of modern genetic epidemiology
Jonathan Mostow (class of 1979) – film director, writer, and film producer
Henry Murphy (class of 1895) – architect; designed Nationalist Chinese monuments as well as Hopkins' 1925 campus, Baldwin Hall, and Hopkins House
Benjamin Matthias Nead (class of 1866) – historian, author, newspaper editor, lawyer, and politician.
John Punnett Peters (class of 1868) – Episcopal clergyman, archaeologist, professor, author
Edwards Pierrepont (class of 1833) – New York Supreme Courtjustice; minister plenipotentiary to Great Britain; United States Attorney General
Abraham Pierson (class of 1664) – first rector of Yale's precursor, the Collegiate School
Harry Rowe Shelley (class of 1876) – composer, organist, music professor 
Selden Palmer Spencer (class of 1880) – lawyer, United States Senator for Missouri
Benjamin Silliman (class of 1833) – early science professor
William Henry Stiles (class of 1825) – United States Representative for Georgia, U.S. chargé d'affaires to Vienna, Confederate colonel 60th GA
Alfred Howe Terry (class of 1838) – American Civil War major general, military commander of the Dakota Territory
Sherman Day Thacher (class of 1879) – founder of The Thacher School 
Thomas Thacher (class of 1867) – lawyer 
Thomas Anthony Thacher (class of 1831-assumed) – classicist, college administrator 
Samantha Vinograd (class of 2001) – American journalist and national security analyst at CNN
Dan Wasserman (class of 1967) – political cartoonist 
Ansley Wilcox (class of 1870) – scholar, Oxford graduate, lawyer, civil service reform commissioner, New York political insider and close friend of Theodore Roosevelt
Washington F. Willcox (class of 1858) – U.S. Representative from Connecticut
Theodore Winthrop (class of 1841) – author 
Theodore Dwight Woolsey (class of 1816) – president of Yale University

References

External links
 

Schools in New Haven, Connecticut
Educational institutions established in the 1660s
1660 establishments in Connecticut
Private high schools in Connecticut
Preparatory schools in Connecticut
Private middle schools in Connecticut